Stigmella epicosma is a moth of the family Nepticulidae. It was described by Edward Meyrick in 1915, and is known from Peru.

External links
Nepticulidae and Opostegidae of the world

Nepticulidae
Moths of South America
Moths described in 1915